Walnut Township is a township in Atchison County, Kansas, United States. As of the 2010 census, its population was 441.

Geography
According to the USGS, it contains three cemeteries: Mount Gillian, Sapp and Sumner.

The streams of Little Walnut Creek, Owl Creek and Walnut Creek run through this township.

References
 USGS Geographic Names Information System (GNIS)

External links
 City-Data.com

Townships in Atchison County, Kansas
Townships in Kansas